George Forrester and Company was a British marine engine and locomotive manufacturer at Vauxhall Foundry  in Liverpool, established by Scottish engineer George Forrester (b. 1780/81). The company opened in 1827 as iron founders and commenced building steam locomotives in 1834.

History
The company was noted in Liverpool directories from 1827 as "Iron founders", the works established in the former "Union Mill" cotton factory, known locally as the "Welsh Factory", built by Messrs. Kirkman & Co. on the east side of Vauxhall Road in the late eighteenth century, but closed after a few years, remaining empty for some time thereafter. The factory was later enlarged and the original building demolished.

A significant product for the company in its early days was the production of machinery involved in sugar processing for the West Indies, before branching into marine engines. A few Railway locomotives were produced from 1834 to 1847. The Crimean War saw the factory stretched to its maximum output in order to produce ammunition.

Locomotives
Under Alexander Allan's attendance the first locomotives were  types, one early in 1834 for the Liverpool and Manchester Railway called Swiftsure and three later that year, Kingstown, Dublin and Vauxhall for the Dublin and Kingstown Railway. In 1835, the Dublin and Kingstown Railway ordered two tank locomotives, Victoria and Comet, these being the first tank locomotives in public service. Two others of the same type produced for the London and Greenwich Railway between 1836 and 1837 were the first in England.

Innovations
They were groundbreaking in that for the first time horizontal cylinders were mounted at the front of the locomotive outside the frame. Forrester also used four fixed eccentrics, rather than two loose ones to operate the valve gear. A single linkage operated the whole arrangement at once, rather than having four for the driver to operate, the handles no longer rocking to and fro while the locomotive was in motion.

Stability problems
Forrester's engines were extremely successful for their time, but the outside cylinders and cranks caused the locomotives to sway so much that they were referred to as "Boxers".  From 1834 an extra trailing axle was added for some for the Liverpool and Manchester Railway. The Dublin and Kingston Railway also converted all their Forrester engines to  well tank engines by 1841, the process being described as "not difficult".

1840s
Three 2-4-0 locomotives were supplied to the London & Brighton Railway between October 1842 and March 1843.  John Urpeth Rastrick inspected the locomotives, which were designed for freight, at the factory and confirmed the workmanship was good but required his own modifications and alterations.

On 6 October 1844, the South Eastern Railway (SER) ordered six Stephenson "long boiler" pattern goods  from a "Robert Browne of Liverpool" though this seemed to be way disguising the manufacturer as Forrester's which whom a director had a familial connection. 

The largest order was for fifteen s in 1847 for the South Eastern Railway.  These like the three for the London & Brighton Railway, were of the Stephenson "long boiler" pattern.

Influence
Between 1840 and 1844, the Dublin and Kingstown Railway built five locomotives at its Grand Canal Street Railway works to a design that drew heavily on the supplied engines from Forrester.

Marine engines

George Forrester and Company built direct-acting side-lever engines of 464hp for the 1150ton SS Liverpool, second steam passenger vessel to cross the Atlantic Ocean from Liverpool. The ship was built at Liverpool in 1837 by Humble and Milcrest for former Lord Mayor of Liverpool, Sir John Tobin who sold her on completion to the Transatlantic Steamship Company, a subsidiary of the City of Dublin Steam Packet Company.

The Liverpool was the first steamship built and fitted up for the transatlantic service and the first transatlantic vessel with two funnels; after making several return journeys to New York she was sold to the Peninsular and Oriental Steam Navigation Company; it was on this vessel that Samuel Cunard came to Liverpool from Halifax, Nova Scotia to commence business as a ship owner. P&O extended the hull of the Liverpool, increasing her tonnage to 1543 while changing the name to Great Liverpool, and put her on the mail service between Southampton and Alexandria; she was holed on a reef 24 February 1846 and went ashore off Cape Finisterre. The surviving wreck is being studied to assess recovery and preservation in a museum.

The first British ocean-going iron warship Nemesis, launched 1839 was powered by 120 hp Forrester engines.

In 1846 the firm built 180 hp engines for the Princess Clementine used in 1849 for superintendent of telegraphs for the South Eastern Railway Company, Charles Vincent Walker's successful experiment off Folkestone to pass messages by submarine cable. Walker sent the first submarine telegraph messages to Chairman of the Railway, James MacGregor.

John McFarlane Gray (1831–1908) designed marine engines and various types of machinery for the firm including the first steam-steering gear, retrofitted to the Great Eastern Steamship Company's liner  in 1867; between 1865 and 1878, the Great Eastern was employed laying submarine cables.

Personnel

The works manager was Scottish mechanical engineer Alexander Allan (1809–1891) until 1840, when he left to take charge of the workshops of the Grand Junction Railway at Edge Hill, using his experience with Forrester to design the outside-cylinder Crewe-type locomotives.

Benjamin Hick Jr (1818–1845) engineer, formerly of B. Hick and Sons, younger brother of politician John Hick, was working for George Forrester and Co. during 1844 when he presented his improved double-cylinder marine engine to the Society of Arts; a pair equal to 220 hp were built for Scottish shipbuilder John Laird and the 573 ton iron paddle steamer PS Helen MacGregor, sailing between Hull and Hamburg for prominent ship owner Joseph Gee (1802–1860). One of the vessel's notable passengers during June 1847 was the young artist James Abbott McNeill Whistler; the Helen MacGregor was the first Hull steamer in the St Petersburg trade. Benjamin Jr died relatively young in 1845, age 27.

Charles Hodgson Horsfall (1810–1847), younger brother of politician Thomas Horsfall, died two years later in 1847.

Partner in the firm, also from a Scottish family, Walter Fergus MacGregor (1812–1863) was the younger brother of James MacGregor (1808–1858), politician, Chairman and General Manager of the South Eastern Railway. MacGregor's mother was also christened Helen.

Walter Fergus MacGregor has a stained glass window and memorial dedicated to his memory in St George's Church, Everton, also the last resting place of Charles Hodgson Horsfall, it reads:

This Monument is erected by
a few of his numerous friends
as a testimony of his great worth
and many excellencies, and the
unfeigned love and esteem they
bear to his memory.

MacGregor's second son, Reverend William MacGregor (1848–1937), used his inherited wealth as benefactor to the town of Tamworth, Staffordshire and became a leading Egyptologist and collector of Egyptian antiquities. He eventually held the position of Vice President of the Liverpool Institute of Archaeology. Items from MacGregor's collection are housed in the Ashmolean Museum, British Museum and Museum of Egyptian Antiquities, Swansea.

Professionalism
During the construction of the first locomotives for the Dublin and Kingstown Railway officers and directors on several occasions visited the works of both Forrester and Sharp, Stewart and Company of Manchester, who were both constructing three engines each for their new railway.  They noted visits to Forresters game them little cause for concern whereas at Sharps the mechanics were at times found to be partaking of "too ardent feasting at craft clubs" with related absenteeism and irregularities.

Closure
Locomotive building finished around 1847, thereafter the firm diversified, closing in 1890. Nothing remains of the former sites at 234, 224 and 40 Vauxhall Road, Liverpool.

See also
 James Cudworth
 Blakely rifle
 SS City of Brussels

References

Sources
 
 
 
 
 

Engine manufacturers of  the United Kingdom
Forrester
Steam engine manufacturers
Manufacturing companies based in Liverpool
Defunct companies based in Liverpool
British companies established in 1827
Ammunition manufacturers